Arthur Alfred Brown (3 December 1858 – 1 July 1909) was an English footballer who played for Aston Villa in the 1880s. He was their first international player, making three appearances for England in 1882. Throughout his career he was known as "Digger" Brown.

Playing career
Brown was born in Spon End, Coventry, the elder brother of Albert Arthur Brown who would also go on to have a career as a footballer with Aston Villa. Arthur began his career playing for local junior sides including Aston Cross, Aston Unity and Aston Comrades before joining the most senior club in the area, Aston Villa in 1878. His initial spell at Villa only lasted a few weeks before he left to join Mitchell St George's.

Two years later, after spells with Birchfield Trinity and Birmingham Excelsior, he re-joined Aston Villa. His favoured position was at inside right but he could play on either wing. Contemporary reports described him as "sturdy, though small, he could dribble through opponents with astonishing ease and grace."

His first England cap came against Ireland on 18 February 1882 when he played alongside his Villa colleague Howard Vaughton. England's 13–0 victory is still the team's largest ever win; the Villa forwards "totally dominated" scoring nine goals between them, with Vaughton scoring five and Brown four. Brown "seemed set for a lengthy career" but, although he played in the two other 1882 internationals against Wales and Scotland (both of which resulted in defeats) he was never again selected for England. His international career spanned 23 days, in which he played three matches scoring four goals.

His club career was before the inception of The Football League and all Brown's club games were in friendlies and in the FA Cup. During his Villa career he played 22 FA Cup matches, scoring 15 goals, often playing alongside his team captain, Archie Hunter. By 1886, ill-health had forced Brown to retire and he therefore missed out on the inaugural Football League season.

He continued to keep up an interest in Villa's affairs until he died on 1 July 1909, aged 50.

Professional baseball
In 1890 Brown played professional baseball for Aston Villa in the National League of Baseball of Great Britain.

References

External links

England profile
Aston Villa profile

1858 births
Footballers from Birmingham, West Midlands
1909 deaths
English footballers
English baseball players
England international footballers
Association football forwards
Aston Unity F.C. players
Aston Villa F.C. players
Birmingham St George's F.C. players
Birmingham Excelsior F.C. players